The Course de la Solidarité Olympique is a road bicycle racing stage race held annually in Poland. From 1991 until 1995, it was a race for amateurs, becoming a professional race in 1996. It was classified as a 2.3 event in 2003 and since 2005, it has been organised as a 2.1 event on the UCI Europe Tour.

Winners
Source:

References

External links
 

Recurring sporting events established in 1990
Cycle races in Poland
UCI Europe Tour races
1990 establishments in Poland
Summer events in Poland